Kaavalkaaran is a 1967 Indian Tamil-language spy action film, directed by P. Neelakantan and produced and co-written by R. M. Veerappan. The film stars M. G. Ramachandran and Jayalalithaa, with M. N. Nambiar, S. A. Ashokan, Sivakumar and Nagesh in supporting roles. It was released on 7 September 1967 and became a major success. The film was remade in Hindi as Rakhwala (1971).

Plot 
Mani, stemming from a modest background, enters in the service of the billionaire Maruthachalam, as the driver. The charming daughter of this fantastically wealthy notable, Susila desperately falls in love with Mani and it is mutual. However, Mani seems to be very worried. He does not confine himself only to his driver's job. Indeed, upset by the terrible secret (that her mother reveals him at the bedside of her agony) on his young brother Chandra and intrigued by the strange behaviour and the actions of his boss, Maruthachalam, Manikkam looks actively for the answers! In spite of the categorical opposition of his father and contrary to all expectations, Susheela marries the man of her life, Manikkam. But does she believe and do they think all to know or to seize Manikkam, really? But who is thus, in reality, this Mani? What does he plot?

Cast 

 M. G. Ramachandran as Mani alias Manickam
 Jayalalithaa as Susila
 Sivakumar as Chandra (alias Chandran)
 Nagesh as Gobi (alias Gobinath), the doctor
 V. K. Ramasamy as Vaithilingham
 Pandari Bai as Karpagam
 M. N. Nambiar as Maruthachalam
 S. A. Ashokan as Nagu
 Usilai Mani as Patient
 Karikol Raju as Patient
 Kallapetti Singaram as Patient
 Ennathe Kannaiah as Doctor
 Vijayarani as Gobi's lover
 Pusphamala as Pushpa

Production 
Before Kaavalkaaran began production, Ramachandran's voice had been damaged due to a gunshot to his throat caused by M. R. Radha. Despite this, Ramachandran refused others' suggestion to use a dubbing artiste, and dubbed in his own voice. The song "Ninaithen Vanthai" has him and Jayalalithaa dressed as Mark Antony and Cleopatra respectively, re-enacting the William Shakespeare play Antony and Cleopatra, and later Layla and Majnun.

Soundtrack 
The music was composed by M. S. Viswanathan.

Release and reception 
Kaavalkaran was released on 7 September 1967. The Indian Express wrote that Veerappan and Neelakantan "made the story gripping with well-punctuated romantic, dramatic and fighting scenes." Kalki called the film a flawless, entertaining film. The film became a major success, and Ramachandran considered it his ninth turning point.

References

External links 

1960s Tamil-language films
1967 films
Films directed by P. Neelakantan
Films scored by M. S. Viswanathan
Indian spy action films
Intelligence Bureau (India) in fiction
Tamil films remade in other languages